The Westmount Rugby Football Club is a Canadian rugby club based in Westmount, Quebec.

Despite McGill University having a team in 1874, Westmount, which claims to have been established in 1876, is the oldest independent (as opposed to college-affiliated) rugby club in North America. Under the title of Montreal Football Club, the club played its matches at the McGill University grounds. The club gathered for social matches and occasions, and never really grew in size until it associated itself with the newly founded Montreal Amateur Athletic Association – which was to become the premier sporting club at the turn of the century and figure prominently in the development of rugby in Montreal, Quebec, and ultimately the Dominion of Canada.

The Montreal Amateur Athletic Association came into existence June 1881 and began as a confederation of three sporting clubs: The Montreal Snow Shoe Club, The Montreal Bicycle Club, and The Montreal Lacrosse Club. These founding clubs shared the club space of the Montreal Gymnasium, located at Mansfield Street and de Maisonneuve Boulevard. In 1884, the Montreal (Rugby) Football Club had upwards of 170 active members, and its first XV achieved an undefeated season, playing clubs from Royal Military College (Kingston), Ottawa, Quebec City, Toronto, British of New York, McGill University, and Bishop's University (Lennoxville, Quebec). The Montreal (Rugby) Football Club had used the McGill University grounds and the nearby Montreal Amateur Athletic Association facility as clubroom, even though it was not formally associated with the Association until 1885.

Also in 1884, the Montreal (Rugby) Football club was instrumental in the formation of the Canadian Rugby Union. Three representatives from the Montreal Club were sent to meet with two representatives from the Toronto Rugby Football Club, and one from the Hamilton Rugby Football Club to meetings in Toronto and Montreal. It was decided that the union would continue to use the English rugby rules, and at the end of the season the winning club of the Quebec Championship would play the Ontario Champion for the Club Championship of the Dominion.

With the amalgamation of the Montreal (Rugby) Football Club into the Montreal Amateur Athletic Association in 1885, the club's grounds were shared with the Montreal Lacrosse Club in the city block downtown bound by Crescent Street, Sherbrooke Street, Bishop Street, and de Maisonneuve Boulevard. Matches were held at this ground only until 1888, when the Montreal Amateur Athletic Association moved its clubhouse to the Westmount Athletic Grounds at the junction of Saint Catherine Street and Hallowell Avenue, due to urban expansion into the downtown pitch and the subsequent dividing of the property into building lots. The Westmount property was landscaped and the Montreal Amateur Athletic Association laid down a cinder track, fences, six hundred yards of drainage, uprights, a pavilion, and a clubhouse. The pitch was, by today's standards larger than an international size rugby pitch. These grounds, aside from playing host to Montreal's rugby and lacrosse matches, also played host to Montreal's most popular sporting events such as bicycle races, athletics, ice hockey in winter, and in 1897 hosted the Jubilee Celebration of Queen Victoria's reign.

At the turn of the century a new quarters was needed to accommodate a rapidly growing membership. In 1905, the Montreal Amateur Athletic Association clubhouse moved to Peel Street (where it currently resides), and the Westmount Athletic Grounds was retained as the club's official athletic grounds until July 1936. The economic depression inflicted severe financial problems upon the Montreal Amateur Athletic Association, and the property was therefore sold to the City of Westmount to help alleviate the economic hardships. In the meantime, rugby football had begun to make its split in North America. Between 1910 and 1920, American-style football gained in popularity; so popular that games were now played in front of larger capacities, and the football club soon split from the Montreal Amateur Athletic Association to form a semi-professional club. Rugby continued at the Westmount Athletic Grounds until 1959, when the Athletic facility was demolished to make way for Westmount High School, and a baseball diamond was built in the middle of the pitch rendering it unsuitable for rugby.

Since its split from the Montreal Amateur Athletic Association in the 1930s, the Rugby Football Club kept its colours of blue and white, but adopted the new name of The Montreal Scottish RFC, owing to its strong Scottish influence within the Montreal Amateur Athletic Association. For years, the Montreal Scottish RFC were the premier rugby club of Quebec, winning almost everything they could possibly arrange to compete for.

By the 1950s, the Montreal Scottish RFC could not accommodate the vast number of players wishing to join the club, and they took on a “Scottish-only” policy by turning away many non-Scottish players. These “exiled” players eventually formed local clubs such as The Montreal Wanderers Rugby Football Club and The Montreal Barbarians Rugby Club. Soon after, noting that this “Scottish-only” policy was not sustainable, the club policy became open to all players of all backgrounds, and the club name changed to the Westmount Rugby Football Club, named after the municipality where its home field had been located for most of its history.

With the demolition of The Westmount Athletic Grounds, the club moved its grounds to the nearby Villa Maria High School, before settling at Westmount Park located in the heart of the city of Westmount. By 1976, the Quebec Rugby Union had grown to six clubs (Ormstown RFC, Montreal Irish RFC, Montreal Wanderers RFC, Montreal Barbarians RC, Town of Mount Royal RFC and Westmount RFC), and Westmount RFC had changed its colours to maroon and white. Also adopted was the raven as a club symbol, owing from the municipal crest of the city of Westmount, where it figures prominently. The club became officially incorporated in 1976.

The club wore maroon jerseys with white shorts until 1997, when it was decided to incorporate black into the uniform. Black shorts were introduced for 'exhibition matches' and the club began to use them regularly afterwards.

The club continues to play in the B Division of the Rugby Quebec, winning the C division championship in 2011. The home field is Westmount Park field, in Westmount. It currently has one competitive men's team, one social men's team, one women's competitive/social team, a juniors program and a minis program.

In 2016 the women's team had an undefeated season and won the Development Division Championship. In 2017 they were promoted to the next higher division.

From a published paper by: Dr. Jonathan James Albright Montreal, Canada September 1998 (Updated, March 2000). Sources: Former / Current Club Members: Mr. Marc Asselin, Mr. Adam Cutler, Mr. Peter Gelinas, and Mr. Michael Nesbitt. McGill: A Celebration. Montreal: McGill – Queen's University Press, 1991. Morrow, Donald. A Sporting Evolution: The Montreal Amateur Athletic Association 1881- 1981. Montreal: Montreal Amateur Athletic Association, 1981. Scrapbook on the Sporting History of Montreal, 1850 – 1920. Vols. I-VII. City of Westmount Public Library.

The Founding of Rugby Quebec
The Westmount Rugby Football Club was one of the founding clubs of Rugby Quebec (FRQ in French). Other founding clubs included Montreal Irish Rugby Football Club, Barbarians, Montreal Wanderers RFC and Town of Mount Royal (TMR).  Every one of these clubs continues to this day, fielding teams across multiple levels of the FRQ league.

References

External links
 Official website
 Fédération de Rugby du Québec
 Westmount Rugby Club: Facebook

Rugby clubs established in 1876
Canadian rugby union teams
Westmount, Quebec
1876 establishments in Canada